The American International School of N'Djamena (AISN) was a small international school in the Chadian capital, N'Djamena. It was an independent coeducational day school which offered an American-style educational program from prekindergarten through grade 8. The school was a non-profit association, governed by a six-member School Board composed of four AISN parents elected by the association, and two representatives of the U.S. Embassy. In 2008, the school shut down in fear of impending war.

At the beginning of the 2004–2005 school year, enrollment was 35, with seven full-time and three part-time professional staff members.

Curriculum 
The curriculum is that of U.S. academic Pre-K – 8 schools. AISN graduates are prepared for further study at U.S. or other American-style international college preparatory schools. Instruction is offered primarily in English. A dual French program is also offered, which serves the needs of "Native French Speaking" (NFS) students and "French as a Foreign Language" (FSL) students separately.

Facilities
The school is located in the "Esso" neighborhood of N'Djamena. In addition to seven classrooms and two administrative offices, there is outdoor sports equipment including badminton and volleyball nets and equipment, a basketball court, soccer goal, and a tetherball set, a playground with two jungle gyms, a 2,000-volume library and a snack-bar/recreation room. All indoor facilities are air conditioned.

Finances
School income derives primarily from tuition and related fees.  In addition, there is a once-only capital levy.

See also

 Chad–United States relations
 Education in Chad
 List of international schools

Sources
This article was adapted from a report by the United States Department of State, released on December 20, 2004. The report is in the public domain, and can be found here.

External links
US Department of State (Archive)
American International School of N'Djamena
Agreement Concerning the Creation of the American International School of N'Djamena Between the Government of the United States and the Government of the Republic of Chad. (Archive). March 5, 2007.

American international schools in Africa
Buildings and structures in N'Djamena
Elementary and primary schools in Chad
International schools in Chad
N'Djamena
2008 disestablishments in Africa
Educational institutions disestablished in 2008
High schools and secondary schools in Chad